Metin Orgarun (1 August 1960 – 30 December 2020) was a Turkish judoka. He competed in the men's half-heavyweight event at the 1984 Summer Olympics. He died on 30 December 2020, due to heart attack at the age of 60.

References

External links
 

1960 births
2020 deaths
Turkish male judoka
Olympic judoka of Turkey
Judoka at the 1984 Summer Olympics
Place of birth missing